In algebra, specifically in the theory of commutative rings, Serre's inequality on height states: given a (Noetherian) regular ring A and a pair of prime ideals  in it, for each prime ideal  that is a minimal prime ideal over the sum , the following inequality on heights holds:

Without the assumption on regularity, the inequality can fail; see scheme-theoretic intersection#Proper intersection.

Sketch of Proof 
Serre gives the following proof of the inequality, based on the validity of Serre's multiplicity conjectures for formal power series ring over a complete discrete valuation ring.

Then the inequality is equivalent to the following inequality: for finite -modules  such that  has finite length,

To show the above inequality, we can assume  is complete. Now, an argument with the Tor spectral sequence shows that . Then one of Serre's conjectures says , which in turn gives the asserted inequality.

References 

 
 

Commutative algebra